Cambridge is a suburb of East London, part of the Buffalo City Metropolitan Municipality in the Eastern Cape province of South Africa.

References

Populated places in Buffalo City Metropolitan Municipality